Actes Sud is a French publishing house based in Arles. It was founded in 1978 by author Hubert Nyssen. By 2013, the company, then headed by Nyssen's daughter, Françoise Nyssen, had an annual turnover of 60 million euros and 60 staff members.

History 
ACTeS was situated in Paradou, a village in the Vallée des Baux. Here, founder Hubert Nyssen, his wife Christine Le Bœuf, (which was the granddaughter of Belgian banker and patron Henry Le Bœuf), his sister Françoise Nyssen, Bertrand Py and Jean-Paul Capitani met and founded Actes Sud. In 1983 Actes Sud moved  to Arles. The publishing house was incorporated on 2 May 1987.

The Actes Sud was a publication of the "Atelier de cartographie thématique et statistique" (ACTeS).

Authors 
A selection of authors Actes Sud  published:

Prizes 
 2004: the book The Scortas' Sun (Le Soleil des Scorta) by Laurent Gaudé, was the first book published by Actes Sud, receiving a Prix Goncourt (Prix Goncourt/Roman). The book sold 400,000 copies.
 2012: Sermon sur la chute de Rome by Jérôme Ferrari was the second book published by Actes Sud honoured by the Prix Goncourt.
 2015:  Compass (Bussole) by Mathias Énard, also published by Actes Sud, received the Prix Goncourt.
 2017: The order of the day (L'Ordre du jour) by Éric Vuillard, published by Actes Sud, got the Prix Goncourt.
 2015: Svetlana Alexievich won the Nobel Prize in Literature.
 2018: Nicolas Mathieu wins the Prix Goncourt for his novel Leurs enfants après eux.

Programme 
Actes Süd provides a catalogue naming 11,500 titles. It has more than two hundred employees, mostly at the sites in Arles and Paris, about twenty external advisors and a plethora of translators work in France and elsewhere

Book series
 Actes Sud BD
 Actes Sud - Classica
 Actes Sud Junior
 Actes Sud - L’An 2
 Actes noirs
 Actes Sud - Papiers
 Actes Sud / Solin
 Actes Sud / Sindbad
 Babel
 Babel noir
 Domaine du possible
 Un endroit où aller
 Exofictions
 Photo Poche

References

External links

Book publishing companies of France
1978 establishments in France
Publishing companies established in 1978
Arles
French brands